The sixth season of the American television spy drama Burn Notice premiered on June 14, 2012, on the cable television channel USA Network.

Cast

John C. McGinley appeared in six episodes as Tom Card, Michael's original CIA trainer.  Taryn Manning appeared in one episode as one of Fiona's fellow prisoners.  Jere Burns and Kristanna Loken returned to the series for multiple episodes as Anson Fullerton and Rebecca Lang, respectively.  Lauren Stamile and Alex Carter also returned to the series as Dani Pearce and Jason Bly, respectively.  Faran Tahir appeared in the third episode as Ahmed, a ruthless Lebanese agent.  William Mapother appeared in the sixth episode as Garret Hartley, a mercenary hired to kill Barry (Paul Tei).  Richard Burgi appeared in the seventh episode as a villain who has targeted Evan (Brando Eaton), the troubled son of Sam's new sugar momma, Elsa (played by Jennifer Taylor).  Angélica Celaya guest starred in the ninth episode of the season as Angela Flores, a woman whose boyfriend is accused of illegally trading weapons on the black market.  Chad Coleman appeared in the tenth episode as Brady Pressman, a CIA operative who, after failing in his mission to capture Anson alive, hopes to set things right. Also appearing in the tenth-to-twelfth episodes was Kenny Johnson as Tyler Gray, the trigger man behind the death of Michael's brother. 

Patton Oswalt and Sonja Sohn each had guest appearances during the winter season. Oswalt appeared in episodes 14-16 as Calvin Schmidt, a smuggler whom the team contacts for help in escaping the country. Sohn plays Olivia Riley, a high-level CIA director who “literally [wrote] the book on counter-intel training and procedures", and she appeared on a recurring basis beginning with the thirteenth episode.

Production
A sixth season, consisting of 18 episodes, was ordered by USA Network on April 16, 2010. This announcement came just over a month after the fourth season had completed airing. The season began in summer 2012.  Jeffrey Donovan stated in a pre-season interview that one of the show's long-standing characters will die during this season.

Matt Nix wrote the first episode of the season, his twentieth credit for the series.  The episode was directed by Stephen Surjik; it was his seventh directing credit for Burn Notice.  Series star Jeffrey Donovan directed one episode as well, his second of the series and first since season 4.

Episodes

References

External links 
 

2012 American television seasons